= Cruz, Honiara =

Cruz
- Ward
- Interactive map of Cruz
- Coordinates: 9°25′55″S 159°57′20″E
- Country: Solomon Islands
- Island: Guadalcanal
- Time zone: UTC+11 (UTC)

Cruz is a suburb of Honiara, Solomon Islands.
